Tim Barrett may refer to:
 Tim Barrett (academic), Professor of East Asian History at SOAS, University of London,
 Tim Barrett (actor) (1929–1990), English actor
 Tim Barrett (admiral) (born 1959), senior Australian naval officer
 Tim Barrett (athlete) (born 1948), Bahamian former triple jumper
 Tim Barrett (baseball) (born 1961), former Major League Baseball pitcher
 Tim Barrett, drummer with the band Disciple
 Timothy Barrett (papermaker), American papermaker